Ronald Shusett (born June 1935) is an American motion picture screenwriter and producer, usually in the science fiction genre.

He wrote the original story for Alien (1979) with Dan O'Bannon and later Alien vs. Predator (2004).

In 1974, he was the first to option the Philip K. Dick short story, "We Can Remember It for You Wholesale", that became the basis of the film Total Recall.

Filmography

References

External links

1935 births
20th-century American screenwriters
21st-century American screenwriters
American male screenwriters
American science fiction writers
Film producers from Pennsylvania
Living people
Writers from Pittsburgh
Hugo Award-winning writers
Screenwriters from Pennsylvania
20th-century American male writers
21st-century American male writers